Bathurst (County) was an electoral district of the Legislative Assembly in the Australian state of New South Wales, named after Bathurst County and including the rural part of the county. The electorate did not include the town of Bathurst which was included in Western Boroughs, until Bathurst was created in 1859. Bathurst (County) was replaced by Carcoar, East Macquarie and West Macquarie in 1859.

John Plunkett was elected as the member for both Bathurst (County) and Argyle. Plunkett was sworn in as member for Argyle and Bathurst on 22 May 1856, before submitting his resignation from Bathurst on 29 May, stating that the rules of the House would not allow him to send in his resignation earlier.

Members for Bathurst (County)

Election results

References

Bathurst (County)
Constituencies established in 1856
Constituencies disestablished in 1859
1856 establishments in Australia
1859 disestablishments in Australia